The 2012 United States Senate election in Delaware took place on November 6, 2012, concurrently with the 2012 U.S. presidential election as well as other elections to the United States Senate and House of Representatives and various state and local elections. Incumbent Democratic U.S. Senator Tom Carper won re-election to a third term in a landslide.

Democratic primary

Candidates

Nominee
 Tom Carper, incumbent U.S. Senator

Eliminated in primary
 Keith Spanarelli, businessman (no endorsement)

Results

General election

Candidates 
 Tom Carper (D), incumbent U.S. Senator
 Andrew Groff (Green), businessman; also endorsed by the Libertarian Party
 Alex Pires (IPoD), businessman and attorney
 Kevin Wade (R), businessman

Debates 
Only one debate was held between Carper, Wade, and Independent Party candidate Pires.

 Complete video of debate, October 16, 2012 - C-SPAN

Predictions

Fundraising

Top contributors

Top industries

Results

See also 
 2012 United States Senate elections
 2012 United States House of Representatives election in Delaware
 2012 Delaware gubernatorial election

References

External links 
 Delaware Office of the Elections Commission
 Campaign contributions at OpenSecrets.org
 Outside spending at the Sunlight Foundation
 Candidate issue positions at On the Issues

Official campaign websites (Archived)
 Tom Carper for U.S. Senate
 Andrew Groff for U.S. Senate
 Alex Pires for U.S. Senate
 Kevin Wade for U.S. Senate

2012
Delaware
Senate